The Earth Negotiations Bulletin (ENB) is a reporting service providing daily coverage on a variety of global environmental and sustainable development negotiations.

The team of environmental negotiations specialists document efforts by the United Nations, national governments, civil society organizations, and other actors  to respond to pressing global challenges, such as climate change, biodiversity loss, land management, over pollution, widening inequality, chemicals and wastes management, trade in endangered species, deep sea mining, and ocean management.

ENB publishes daily reports and summaries in print and online, distributing news through web, email, and social media feeds. Their outputs are also distributed at meeting venues during conferences of the parties to multilateral environmental agreements.

ENB is a division of the International Institute for Sustainable Development.

History 

The Earth Negotiations Bulletin (originally titled the Earth Summit Bulletin) began as the joint initiative of three individuals from the NGO community, who were publishing a daily bulletin at the United Nations Conference on Environment and Development (UNCED) in 1992. Namely, Johannah Bernstein, an environmental lawyer and Director of the Canadian Participatory Committee for UNCED, Pamela Chasek, a doctoral student at Johns Hopkins University’s Paul H. Nitze School of Advanced International Studies, and Langston James Goree VI "Kimo", a former UNDP programme officer and NGO activist from the Western Amazon.

The International Institute for Sustainable Development (IISD) approached the three founders with an offer to continue publishing the Earth Summit Bulletin at follow-up negotiations to the Earth Summit. In November 1992, the Earth Summit Bulletin was renamed the Earth Negotiations Bulletin. Since 1993, the Earth Negotiations Bulletin has covered over 30 negotiating processes within the United Nations system.

Personnel 
Earth Negotiations Bulletin is staffed by a diverse, global group of researchers, academics, and communications professionals with decades of experience covering environmental and sustainable development negotiations. Many writers on the ENB team are Ph.D. candidates, lawyers, or Ph.Ds. with unmatched expertise in international processes and a shared passion for a more just, sustainable planet.

Many writers join the team while in graduate school and eventually move on to careers in international organizations. Conversely, retired career diplomats from the United States, Russia, and China have also brought their experience to the team.

Coverage 

The ENB covers a range of topics in sustainability.  Core coverage areas include:

 Sustainable Development, including the Commission on Sustainable Development
 Climate and Atmosphere, including the UN Framework Convention on Climate Change, Intergovernmental Panel on Climate Change, and Montreal Protocol
Biodiversity and Wildlife, including the Convention on Biological Diversity, Commission on Genetic Resources for Food and Agriculture, Convention on International Trade in Endangered Species, Convention on Migratory Species, and Intergovernmental Science-Policy Platform on Biodiversity and Ecosystem Services (formerly the International Mechanism of Scientific Expertise on Biodiversity)
 Forests, Deserts and Land, including the United Nations Forum on Forests, International Tropical Timber Organization Council, and FAO Committee on Forestry
Chemicals Management, including the Basel Convention, Rotterdam Convention and Stockholm Convention
 Human Development, including UN-HABITAT
 Organizations, including the United Nations Environment Programme
 Trade and Investment, including the Global Environment Facility
 Water, Oceans and Wetlands, including the World Water Forum, Global Conference on Oceans, Coasts and Islands, the Informal Consultative Process on Oceans and the Law of the Sea, the Straddling Fish Stocks Agreement, the Working Group on Marine Biodiversity Beyond Areas of National Jurisdiction, and the Ramsar Convention on Wetlands.

Reporting teams are also sent to a variety of conferences on sustainability that fall outside the confines of the list above, under agreements with conference organizers.  These conferences include regional negotiations, conferences dealing with sustainability in specific industries such as the International Hydropower Association World Congress on Sustainable Hydropower, and special-interest days within larger conferences, such as "Business Day" during UN Climate Change conferences.

References

External links 
, including archives
IISD’s Innovative Earth Negotiations Bulletin Website. (2021, February 25). Convention on Biological Diversity. 
Cicin-Sian, Biliana (1996). “Earth Summit implementation: progress since Rio”. Marine Policy. 20(2). 123-143. https://doi.org/10.1016/S0308-597X(96)00002-4
Jinnah, S. & Jungcurt, S. (2009). “Could Access Requirements Stifle Your Research?”. Science. 323(5913). 464-465. 
Chasek, Pamela (2005). Environmental Organizations and Multilateral Diplomacy: A Case Study of Earth Negotiations Bulletin. In P. Muldoon, Jr., J. (2005). Multilateral Diplomacy and the United Nations Today (2nd ed.). Routledge. https://doi.org/10.4324/9780429494949
Chasek, Pamela (2001). Earth negotiations: Analyzing thirty years of environmental diplomacy. United Nations University Press. 
Chasek, P. & Wagner, L. (2012). The roads from Rio: Lessons learned from twenty years of multilateral environmental negotiations. Routledge.

Environmental magazines
American environmental websites
Environmental conferences
International environmental law
Magazines established in 1992
International environmental organizations
American news websites
Magazines published in New York City